The Basilica of Our Lady of Consolation (also Basilica of Táriba) is a Catholic church located in the locality of Táriba in Táchira state in the Andes of Venezuela. It gained the title of basilica via Pontifical decree on 20 October 1959. 

The basilica enshrines a venerated Marian image granted a Pontifical decree of coronation on 9 November 1959 by Pope John XXIII. The coronation occurred on 12 March 1967.

Its history goes back to the hermitage built in the early times by the Augustinians who needed a church of sufficient hierarchy and dimensions sufficient for a growing parish as well as pilgrims. The priest Francisco Martínez de Espinoza, curate and vicar of the Villa of San Cristóbal, began the construction of the first temple dedicated to the Virgin of Táriba on 19 August 1690, which would later also be replaced.

The present church is dedicated to Our Lady of Consolation, patron of the state Táchira. Pope John XXIII gave it the title of minor basilica, as a work of Monsignor Miguel Ignacio Briceño Picón and due to the efforts made by Monsignor Alejandro Fernández Feo during the period of 1904 and 1913. It was remodeled under the administration of Monsignor Alejandro Figueroa Medina for the approaching date of the canonical coronation of the virgin.

The basilica was critically rebuilt in the 1960s due to the contributions of Martín Marciales Moncada.

See also
Roman Catholicism in Venezuela
Basilica and National Shrine of Our Lady of Consolation

References

Basilica churches in Venezuela
Roman Catholic churches completed in 1690
17th-century Roman Catholic church buildings in Venezuela